Country Code: +503
International Call Prefix: 00

National Significant Numbers (NSN): seven or eight digits.

Format: +503 NXYZ MCDU where 'N' is the National Destination Code (NDC), and 'X', 'Y', 'Z', 'M', 'C', 'D', and 'U' stand for millions, hundred thousands, ten thousands, thousands, hundreds, tens, and units, respectively.

Number plan
New number plan took effect in 2005.

The numbering plan for the Republic of El Salvador uses the following numbering structure:
for services provided via eight (8) digit access networks including the NDC,
freephone numbers and premium rate numbers use seven (7) and eight (8) digits.

Notes
The numbering for the freephone service for the user making the call retains its 7 and 11 digit form, with the formats 800 XXXX and 800 XXXX XXXX.
The numbering for the premium rate service for the user making the call retains its 7 and 11 digit form, with the formats 900 XXXX and 900 XXXX XXXX.

See also 
 Telecommunications in El Salvador

References

El Salvador
Communications in El Salvador